A rotary woofer is a subwoofer-style loudspeaker which reproduces very low frequency content by using a conventional speaker voice coil's motion to change the pitch of an impeller rotating at a constant speed. The pitch of the fan blades is controlled by the audio signal presented to the voice coil, and is able to swing both positive and negative, with respect to a zero pitch spinning blade position. Since the audio amplifier only changes the pitch of the blades, it takes much less power, per dB of generated acoustic sound level, to drive a rotary woofer than to power a conventional subwoofer, which uses a moving electromagnet (voice coil) placed within the field of a stationary permanent magnet to drive a cone which then displaces air.  Rotary woofers excel at producing sounds below 20 Hz, below the normal hearing range; when installed in the wall of a sealed room, they can produce audio frequencies down to 0 Hz, a static pressure differential, by simply compressing the air in the sealed room.

Description
In the early 1970s, researchers noted that while humans could detect frequencies below 20 Hz, the ear was much less sensitive to these frequencies. As a result, increased sound pressure levels are required to perceive these sounds. These frequencies are often not audible but still subliminally detected by humans (see: Infrasound). Typical subwoofers using moving cones do not transmit energy very well to the air below 20 Hz, and thus their sound pressure level (SPL) falls off significantly below this frequency.

To help people to perceive the very-low-frequency content available in recorded material, Bruce Thigpen of Eminent Technology experimented with new methods of producing the required SPL. The rotary woofer displaces far more air than is possible using moving cones, which makes very-low-frequency reproduction possible.

Instead of using a moving electromagnet (voice coil) placed within the field of a stationary permanent magnet to drive a cone, like a conventional subwoofer, on a rotary woofer, the voice coil's motion is used to change the angle of a fixed rotation speed set of fan blades in order to generate sound pressure waves. The pitch of the blades change according to the signal the amplifier supplies, producing a modulated sound wave due to the air moved by the spinning blades. If there is no signal applied, the blades simply rotate "flat" at zero pitch, producing no sound. Since the audio amplifier only changes the pitch of the blades, it takes much less power to drive a rotary woofer, although a secondary power source is required to drive the fan motor.

As an analogy, the hub of the rotary woofer's fan is somewhat like a helicopter's swashplate which allows a stationary source of reciprocating motion—the voice coil of the subwoofer—to change the angle of the spinning set of blades.

A rotary woofer is designed to produce only frequencies lower than 20 Hz; distortion increases as the input frequency exceeds the fan's rotation rate (20 Hz would be about 1200 rpm for the fan), which is itself limited by the need to avoid making higher-frequency noise (due to the sound of the spinning blades).  Current models use an AC induction motor spinning at 800 RPM (13 Hz). The woofer is installed and carefully braced so that the blades lie in a circular opening, so that air can be moved between an external chamber, such as the attic of a house, and the main listening space; if the rotary woofer were not installed in such a "baffle" and placed directly in the main space instead, the generated sound pressure from the rear of the unit being 180 degrees out of phase would almost completely cancel that from the front the end, the result of which would not be fit for its intended application.

This suggests that for sound to be perceived at 7–8 Hz, the 7–8 Hz SPL would have to be 12.3 dB higher than the 92.0 dB SPL required at 15.5 Hz, which means that the 7–8 Hz SPL would require at least 104 dB of SPL to be perceived. For 3 Hz to be perceived, the SPL would need to add another 12.3 dB, or reach 116 dB of SPL, to be perceived.

Installations
Six rotary woofers are installed as part of an immersive Niagara Falls attraction known as Niagara's Fury, located in the Table Rock House, to provide low frequency extension down to less than 1 Hertz, to emulate those waves created by the falls.

See also
 Eminent Technology
 Civil defense siren

References

Sources
 Danish study on Infrasound 
 Journal of Acoustic Society paper by Yeowart and Evans
 UK government paper on very low frequency sound

External links
 Rotary Woofer site
 International Audio Review Technical Article
 Rotary Woofer Installation Blog

Loudspeakers